This is a list of parks in Delhi. Delhi includes the areas of New Delhi, Faridabad, Gurgaon, Noida and Ghaziabad.

Many of them are maintained by the Delhi Development Authority while some parks such as Sunder Nursery and Park is run through a public-private partnership model. Some of the park which are home to historic monuments are come under the jurisdiction of the Archaeological Survey of India.

List of parks in Delhi 
 Waste To Wonder Park, Seven wonder Park, Saraikale Khan
 Swarn jayanti park rohini
 Aartha Kunj
 Buddha Jayanti Park
 Central Park, Connaught Place

 Central Park (Sunder Nursery)
 Deer Park
 Delhi Ridge
 Garden of Five Senses
 Gulmohar Park
 Indraprasht Park
 Jahanpanah City Forest
 Lodhi Gardens
 Kalindi Kunj
 Nehru Park, Delhi
 Netaji Subhash Park
 Talkatora Gardens
 Lake Park-Sanjay Park
 Aaram Bagh
 Roshanara Bagh
 Shalimar Bagh
 Mughal Gardens
Lalita Park

References 

 
Parks
Delhi